Bolshoy Kekuknaysky is a volcano located in the central part of the Kamchatka Peninsula, Russia. It comprises two shield volcanoes: Bolshoy (1301 m) and Kekuknaysky (1401 m). Their lava flows and cinder cones have dammed a valley dissecting the mountain, creating the Bolshoye Goltsovoye and Maloye Goltsovoe lakes. The last eruption occurred at Kekuk Crater, about 7,200 years ago.

See also
List of volcanoes in Russia

References

New data on Holocene monogenetic volcanism of the northern Kamchatka: ages and space distribution, by Maria M. Pevzner

Mountains of the Kamchatka Peninsula
Volcanoes of the Kamchatka Peninsula
Shield volcanoes of Russia
Holocene shield volcanoes
Holocene Asia
Polygenetic shield volcanoes